The discography of Francesco Gabbani, an Italian singer and songwriter. His debut studio album, Greitist Iz, was released in May 2014. It peaked at number 59 on the Italian Albums Chart. The album includes the singles "I dischi non si suonano" and "Clandestino". His second studio album, Eternamente ora, was released in February 2016. It peaked at number 18 on the Italian Albums Chart. "Amen" was released as the lead single from the album on 27 November 2015. The song peaked at number 14 on the Italian Singles Chart. The song took part in Sanremo Music Festival 2016 he won the final of the Newcomers' section. "Eternamente ora" was released as the second single from the album on 6 May 2016. "In equilibrio" was released as the third single from the album on 12 September 2016. His third studio album, Magellano, was released in April 2017. It peaked at number 1 on the Italian Albums Chart. "Occidentali's Karma" was released as the lead single from the album on 10 February 2017. The song peaked at number 1 on the Italian Singles Chart. In February 2017, Gabbani won Sanremo Music Festival 2017 and accepted the invitation to represent Italy in the Eurovision Song Contest, which took place at the International Exhibition Centre in Kyiv, Ukraine. As a member of the "Big 5", Italy automatically qualified to compete in the final, which was held on 13 May 2017.

Albums

Studio albums

Live albums

Soundtrack albums

Singles

As lead artist

As featured artist

Promotional singles

References

Notes

Sources

Gabbani